This is a list of individuals and events related to Azerbaijan in 2022.

Incumbents

Events

Ongoing 
 COVID-19 pandemic in Azerbaijan

January 

 January 5 — 2022 was declared the "Year of Shusha"
 January 7 — "Khanim Fatimeyi-Zahra" mosque in Yeni Günəşli settlement of Suraxanı district was put into use after reconstruction
 January 10 — Ilham Aliyev accepted he credentials of the newly appointed ambassadors of South Korea and Algeria to Azerbaijan:
 Ambassador of South Korea - Lee In-Yong
 Ambassador of Algeria - Abdelouahab Osman
 January 14 — Ilham Aliyev visited Ukraine and met President of Ukraine Volodymyr Zelenskyy in Kyiv
 January 18 — Ilham Aliyev inaugurated the statue of Haji Zeynalabdin Taghiyev in Baku

February 

 February 11 — A new 20 manat banknote was put into circulation
 February 21
 Ilham Aliyev visited Russia
 2 members of Azerbaijan Parliament (Tahir Mirkishili and Soltan Mammadov) visited Armenia and met Prime Minister of Armenia Nikol Pashinyan in Yerevan
 February 22
 Ilham Aliyev met President of Russia Vladimir Putin in Moscow
 The Moscow Declaration was signed

March 

 March 10 — Ilham Aliyev visited Turkey and met President of Turkey Recep Tayyip Erdoğan in Ankara
 March 24 — Farukh operation: Units of Azerbaijan Army entered Farukh village of Khojaly district
 March 26 — Farukh operation: Farukh village, Farukh mountain, Daşbaşı hill and Sagsagan mountain range of Khojaly district were liberated from occupation. Aghdam and 9 villages of district were removed from the visual control of the Armenians. Visual control of Khankendi-Aghdara highway was achieved
 March 31 — Shusha was declared "Culture Capital of the Turkic World" for 2023

April 

 April 3 — An explosion occurred in the "Location Baku" night club in Baku. 3 people died and 35 were injured
 April 14 — Prime Minister of Albania Edi Rama visited Azerbaijan and met Ilham Aliyev in Baku
 April 19
 Ilham Aliyev accepted he credentials of the newly appointed ambassadors of UAE, Cuba and Egypt to Azerbaijan:
 Ambassador of UAE - Mohammed Al Blushi
 Ambassador of Cuba - Carlos Enrique Valdes de la Concepcion
 Ambassador of Egypt - Hisham Mohammed Nagy Abdel Hamid
 President of Kyrgyzstan Sadyr Japarov visited Azerbijan
 April 20 — Ilham Aliyev met President of Kyrgyzstan Sadyr Japarov in Baku
 April 22 — 23 — V Congress of World Azerbaijanis (Shusha)

May 

 May 5 — 8 — I International Culinary Festival (Shusha)
 May 6 — 7 — "President's Cup-2022" International Tournament (Sugovushan, Tartar) (Mingachevir)
 May 10 — 14 — Eurovision Song Contest 2022 (Turin, Italy)
 Song: Fade To Black
 Singer: Nadir Rustamli
 Place: 16
 Score: 106
 May 12 — 14 — V Kharibulbul Music Festival (Shusha)
 May 14 — Ilham Aliyev visited Turkey and met President of Turkey Recep Tayyip Erdoğan in Rize
 May 17 — President of Lithuania Gitanas Nausėda visited Azerbaijan
 May 18 — Ilham Aliyev met President of Lithuania Gitanas Nausėda in Baku
 May 20 — 27 — I Baku International Piano Festival
 May 26 — 29 — Teknofest Festival 2022

June 
 June 2 — 4 — VII International Congress of Social Sciences (Baku) (Shusha)
 June 10 — 12 — 2022 Azerbaijan Grand Prix (Baku)
 1 - Max Verstappen (150 points)
 2 - Sergio Pérez (129 points)
 3 - Charles Leclerc (116 points)
 June 16
 President of Georgia Salome Zourabichvili visited Azerbaijan and met Ilham Aliyev in Baku
 President of Albania Ilir Meta visited Azerbaijan and met Ilham Aliyev in Baku
 Director-General of the World Health Organization Tedros Adhanom Ghebreyesus visited Azerbaijan and met Ilham Aliyev in Baku
 President of Venezuela Nicolás Maduro visited Azerbaijan
 June 16 — 18 — IX Global Baku Forum
 June 17 — President of Venezuela Nicolás Maduro met Ilham Aliyev in video format
 June 21 — Ilham Aliyev visited Uzbekistan and met President of Uzbekistan Shavkat Mirziyoyev in Tashkent
 June 29
 Ilham Aliyev visited Turkmenistan and met President of Turkmenistan Serdar Berdimuhamedow in Ashgabat
 VI Caspian Summit was held in Ashgabat, Turkmenistan
 Ilham Aliyev met President of Russia Vladimir Putin in Ashgabat, Turkmenistan
 Ilham Aliyev met President of Iran Ebrahim Raisi in Ashgabat, Turkmenistan

July 
 July 12 — Ilham Aliyev accepted the credentials of the newly appointed ambassador of Czech Republic to Azerbaijan
 Ambassador of the Czech Republic - Milan Sedláček
 July 14 — 15 — 2022 Vagif Poetry Days (Shusha)
 July 18 — President of European Commission Ursula von der Leyen visited Azerbaijan and met Ilham Aliyev in Baku
 July 19 — 25 — 1st stage of resettlement of residents to Agali village, which was rebuilt on the basis of the concept of "smart village" in Zangilan district
 July 20 — September 9 — Summer Fest 2022

Deaths

January

 January 1
 Ramiz Abutalibov, historian and diplomat (b. 1937)
 Madina Giyasbeyli, associate professor of BSU, pedagogue, doctor of philosophy in pedagogy (b. 1948)
 January 2 — Maharram Mammadyarov, scientist (b. 1924)
 January 4 — Kamal Babayev , photographer, journalist (b. 1927)
 January 8
 Novruz Gartal, actor (b. 1947)
 Inna Gurbanova, senior researcher of ANAS, doctor of biological sciences (b. 1937)
 January 10
 Abdurrahman Vazirov, politician, 13th leader of Azerbaijan SSR (1988–1990) (b. 1930)
 Tofig Babanli, boxer, coach (b. 1937)
 January 13 — Farrukh Zeynalov, deputy, Minister of Mineral Resources (b. 1942)
 January 14
 Ramiz Aliyev, filmmaker (b. 1938)
 Garib Orujov, Hero of Socialist Labor (b. 1935)
 January 15 — Alikram Taghiyev , doctor of philosophy, professor (b. 1945)
 January 19 — Aydin Abdullayev , producer, film production organizer (b. 1951)
 January 21 — Nizami Agayev , soil scientist, agrochemical scientist, doctor of agricultural sciences, professor (b. 1936)
 January 23 — Minira Garayeva , pedagogue, linguist, professor (b. 1937)
 January 26
 Sadreddin Sadreddinov, associate professor of BSU (b. 1941)
 Azadkhan Adigozelov, doctor of pedagogical sciences, professor (b. 1940)
 January 27 — Shaig Safarov, theatrologist (b. 1954)

February

 February 2 — Aydin Karimov, poet, journalist (b. 1934)
 February 3 — Nariman Shikhaliyev, filmmaker (b. 1934)
 February 5 — Galina Mikeladze, journalist (b. 1931)
 February 6 — Shohlat Afshar, poet (b. 1949)
 February 7 — Ali Vakil, poet, translator (b. 1938)
 Fevruary 8
 Fikret Hashimov, artist (b. 1948)
 Eleonora Rajabova, lawyer (b. 1933)
 Fakhreddin Ali, artist (b. 1938)
 February 10 — Vagif Seyidov, doctor of medical sciences, professor (b. 1941)
 February 13 — Afgan Askerov, writer (b. 1929)
 February 15 — Mammad Chiragov, professor (b. 1938)
 February 16 — Aydin Abiyev, lexicographer, doctor of philological sciences, professor (b. 1939)
 February 17 — Anwar Ahmad, poet, translator (b. 1943)
 February 22 — Kamil Jalilov, composer, musician (b. 1938)
 February 24 — Arif Gaziyev, television director, screenwriter (b. 1938)
 February 25 — Alibaba Mammadov, singer, composer (b. 1929)

March

 March 4 — Albert Mustafayev, artist (b. 1931)
 March 5 — Zehmet Shahverdiyev , doctor of historical sciences, professor (b. 1942)
 March 10 — Rustam Ibragimbekov, screenwriter, playwright and producer (b. 1939)
 March 11 — Faig Hasanov, chemist (b. 1939)
 March 13 — Ajdar Ismailov, philologist, co-founder of New Azerbaijan Party (b. 1938)
 March 15 — Zaur Yusifov, boxer (b. 1984)
 March 17 — Musa Mammadov, doctor of geology and mineralogy, professor (b. 1940)
 March 18 — Beybala Usubaliyev, doctor of chemical sciences, scientist (b. 1951)
 March 21 — Almaz Taghiyeva, doctor of pedagogical sciences, scientist (b. 1962)
 March 22 — Maksim Shamil, poet (b. 1952)
 March 25 — Reza Baraheni, South Azerbaijani writer, poet, critic (b. 1935)
 March 26 — Shakir Hasanov, engineer, politician (b. 1947)
 March 27 — Ayaz Mutallibov, 14th leader of Azerbaijan SSR (1989–1990) and 1st President (1990–1992) (b. 1938)
 March 28 — Vahdat Sultanzadeh, diplomat (b. 1935)

April

 April 1 — Zulfugar Abbasov, actor, director (b. 1940)
 April 2
 Ali Ismayilov, engineer (b. 1948)
 Vilayat Kahramanzade, musician, member of "Rast" band (b. ?)
 April 8 — Teymur Bunyadov, doctor of historical sciences, professor (b. 1928)
 April 14 — Ilgar Fatizadeh, economist, statesman (b. 1956)
 April 22 — Ogtay Hajiyev, singer, composer (b. 1951)
 April 30 — Namig Aslanov, police colonel (b. 1965)

May

 May 5 — Giyas Guliyev, doctor of biological sciences, scientist (b. 1947)
 11 May
 Mazahir Suleymanzadeh, journalist (b. 1952)
 Musa Bagirov, director, screenwriter (b. 1932)
 May 16 — Fuad Valikhanov, TV presenter, producer (b. 1941)
 May 19
 Vagif Asadov, actor, director (b. 1947)
 Tofig Mammadov, doctor of biological sciences, professor (b. 1957)
 May 31 — Tosu Zangilanli, phenomenon (b. 1993)

June

 June 2 — Rahid Rahmanov, volcanologist, doctor of geology and mineralogy (b. 1936)
 June 5 — Ali Babayev, statesman (b. 1957)
 June 7 — Nasir Ahmadli, doctor of philological sciences, professor (b. 1942)
 June 8 — Intigam Mehdizadeh, writer, publicist, journalist, screenwriter (b. 1945)
 June 17
 Muzamil Abdullayev, 1st Minister of Agriculture of Azerbaijan (b. 1941)
 Alistan Akbarov, scientist, linguist, philologist (b. 1940)
 June 20
 Aida Huseynova, musicologist, doctor of philosophy in art studies, professor (b. 1964)
 Eldar Salayev, doctor of physical and mathematical sciences, scientist, 8th President of ANAS (b. 1933)

July

 July 10 — Envar Chingizoglu, writer, publicist (b. 1962)
 July 11 — Akif Musayev, economist, scientist, professor (b. 1947)
 July 16 — Mais Mammadov, TV host journalist (b. 1938)
 July 17 — Sevda Ibrahimova, composer (b. 1939)
 July 31 — Aliya Tahmasib, educational worker (b. 1947)

August

 August 3 — Araz Zeynalov, journalist, publicist (b. 1961)
 August 5 — Ataxan Pashayev, historian (b. 1938)
 August 6 — Zahid Sharifov, doctor of technical sciences, professor (b. 1962)
 August 9
 Arif Maharramov, artist (b. 1948)
 Ramin Mahmudzadeh, scientist, academic (b. 1935)
 August 16 — Firangiz Rahimbeyli, singer, actress (b. 1960)
 August 23 — Hikmet Ibrahimov, doctor of technical sciences, professor, scientist (b. 1951)
 August 26 — Nazim Mammadov, statesman, lieutenant general (b. 1951)
 August 27 — Jamila Hasanzadeh, doctor of art studies, professor, author of the book "Magical Tales of Tabriz" (b. 1947)

September

 September 1 — Zahid Aliyev, doctor of technical sciences, professor, oil scientist (b. 1935)
 September 3 — Sayavush Mammadzade, poet, translator (b. 1935)
 September 4 — Asif Azerelli, artist (b. 1946)
 September 15 — Khalil Yusifli , doctor of philological sciences, professor, scientist (b. 1935)
 September 22 — Fargana Guliyeva, actress (b. 1957)
 September 30 — Rahim Rahimli, singer, composer (b. 1976)

October

 October 6 — Araz Alizadeh, politician (b. 1951)
 October 9 — Ruhangiz Gasimova, composer (b. 1940)
 October 15 — Shakir Yagubov, journalist, cultural worker (b. 1951)
 October 18
 Yafes Turkses, poet (b. 1954)
 Ogtay Seyidbeyov, doctor of medical sciences, professor (b. 1940)
 October 21 — Surkhay Taghizadeh, public and statesman, deputy (b. 1932)
 October 23 — Suleyman Abdullayev, singer (b. 1939)
 October 26 — Mashallah Abdullayev, statesman, National Hero (b. 1950)

November

 November 1 — Leyla Safarova, film director, screenwriter (b. 1945)
 November 2 — Rana Gashgai, doctor of geography, academician (b. 1938)
 November 4 — Fazil Mammadov, politician, Minister of Taxes of Azerbaijan (b. 1964)
 November 12 — Ali Rajabli, doctor of historical sciences, professor, numismatist-archaeologist (b. 1927)
 November 15 — Ikhtiyar Shirinov, politician, 3rd Prosecutor General of Azerbaijan (b. 1952)
 November 17 — Alikhan Niftaliyev, singer, cultural worker (b. 1943)
 November 18 — Nazim Bababeyli, deputy (b. 1953)
 November 19 — Natig Gulmammadov, theater worker (b. 1955)
 November 20 — Nobert Yevdayev, poet, writer, artist, journalist (b. 1929)
 November 28 — Musa Rustamov, doctor of technical sciences, professor, academician (b. 1930)
 November 29 — Ilkin Zarbaliyev, journalist (b. 1977)

December

 December 1
 Yadollah Maftun Amini, South Azerbaijani poet (b. 1926)
 Rahib Abbasov, medical service colonel, high-ranking therapist (b. 1939)
 December 4 — Aziz Orujov, deputy, Minister of Construction of Nakhchivan Autonomous Republic (b. 1957)
 December 8
 Maqsuda Aliyeva, actress (b. 1965)
 Isfandiyar Karabakhi, South Azerbaijani singer (b. 1942)
 December 11 — Vilayat Aliyev, doctor of philological sciences, professor (b. 1938)
 December 15 — Ogtay Rajabov, composer, doctor of pedagogical sciences, professor (b. 1941)
 December 16 — Sadiq Ahmadov, actor (b. 1960)
 December 19 — Kazim Aliverdibeyov, conductor (b. 1934)
 December 20
 Abasgulu Guliyev, chemist, scientist (b. 1940)
 Asiyat Yusifova, Azerbaijani-Soviet statesman (b. 1923)
 December 22
 Fikret Verdiyev, musician (b. 1947)
 Alakram Humbatov, politician, President of the Republic of Talysh-Mugan, the main causative of the Talysh-Mugan crisis (b. 1948)
 December 23 — Oruj Gurbanov, director (b. 1949)
 December 26 — Nadir Abdullayev, doctor of philological sciences, professor, methodist, pedagogue (b. 1935)

References

Notes

Citations

2022 in Azerbaijan
2020s in Azerbaijan
Years of the 21st century in Azerbaijan
Azerbaijan
Azerbaijan